Euglesa maasseni is a species of bivalve belonging to the family Sphaeriidae.

References

Sphaeriidae